Lomond is one of the six wards used to elect members of the West Dunbartonshire Council. It elects three Councillors.

The ward covers the northern parts of the Vale of Leven closest to Loch Lomond and the rural area east of the loch, including Balloch, Gartocharn, Jamestown, Levenvale, Mill of Haldane, Rosshead and Tullichewan.

Councillors

Election results

2022 election
2022 West Dunbartonshire Council election

2017 election
2017 West Dunbartonshire Council election

2012 election
2012 West Dunbartonshire Council election

2007 election
2007 West Dunbartonshire Council election

References

Wards of West Dunbartonshire
Vale of Leven
Loch Lomond